Longitrichanenteria is a genus of mites in the family Nenteriidae.

Species
The following 6 species are within Longitrichanenteria:
 Longitrichanenteria densaeporula (Hirschmann, 1985)     
 Longitrichanenteria longicrinis (Hirschmann, 1985)     
 Longitrichanenteria longipilosa (Hirschmann, 1985)     
 Longitrichanenteria longitricha (Hirschmann, 1972)     
 Longitrichanenteria semicirculata (Hirschmann, 1985)     
 Longitrichanenteria serrulata (Hirschmann & Wisniewski, 1985)

References

Mesostigmata